The Albany-Colonie Yankees were a Minor League Baseball team that played in the Double-A Eastern League from 1983 to 1994. They were located in Colonie, New York, and played their home games at Heritage Park.  The team was known as the Albany A's in their inaugural 1983 season and the Albany-Colonie A's in 1984 after their Major League Baseball affiliate, the Oakland Athletics. They were renamed the Albany-Colonie Yankees in 1985 when they became an affiliate of the New York Yankees. The team retained the Yankees moniker through their final season in 1994.

For the first 11 years of Albany-Colonie's 12-year membership in the Eastern League, the circuit played without divisions. The top four teams qualified for the playoffs. The A's/Yankees qualified for the postseason on eight occasions, including four seasons by virtue of winning the regular season pennant (1984, 1985, 1989, and 1990). They won the Eastern League championship three times (1988, 1989, and 1991).

See also
Former players (1985–1994)
Former players (1983–1984)

References

Defunct Eastern League (1938–present) teams
New York Yankees minor league affiliates
Oakland Athletics minor league affiliates
Sports in Albany, New York
Defunct baseball teams in New York (state)
Baseball teams established in 1983
Baseball teams disestablished in 1994
1983 establishments in New York (state)
1994 disestablishments in New York (state)